Brizzi may refer to :

Meneghino del Brizzi (c. 1600-after 1678), Italian painter from Bologna
Alberto Brizzi (born 1984), Italian professional tennis player.
Aldo Brizzi (born 1960), Italian composer and director.
Anchise Brizzi (1887–1964), Italian cinematographer.
Enrico Brizzi (born in Bologna, November 20, 1974) is an Italian writer.
Fausto Brizzi (Rome 15 November 1968) is an Italian screenwriter and film director.
Filippo Brizzi (1603-1675) was an Italian painter of the Baroque period. 
Jeremy Brizzi (born in McHenry, IL, October 8, 1976) is an American writer and musician.
Maria Brizzi Giorgi (1775–1812, Italian organist, composer and pianist.
Mary T. Brizzi, pen name of Mary A. Turzillo (born 1940), American science fiction writer.
Massimiliano Brizzi (born 1975), Italian football player.
Paul and Gaëtan Brizzi (both born December 24, 1951) are twin artists and animators from France. 
Serafino Brizzi (1684-1724) was an Italian engraver of the Baroque period.
Umberto Brizzi (born January 20, 1908) is an Italian weightlifter.

Italian-language surnames